is a shōjo manga artist. She is best known for Honey x Honey Drops, which has been licensed in multiple languages and adapted as an original video animation (OVA). Her current series, Kyō, Koi o Hajimemasu, is a best-seller that regularly appears on the Tohan comics charts. She writes mainly for Shōjo Comic. She has sold more than 10 million copies. On the Nikkei Entertainment magazine's list of top 50 manga creators by the amount of sales since January 2010, Kanan Minami ranked 24 out of the 50 manga creators. Her representative work for the sales is Kyō, Koi o Hajimemasu. She sold 2,498,000 copies.

Personal life

Minami gave birth to a daughter in 2014.

Manga

As contributor

References

External links 
  
 
  Kanan Minami at Media Arts Database 

Living people
Japanese female comics artists
Female comics writers
Manga artists
Women manga artists
Japanese women writers
1979 births